Windows Desktop Gadgets (called Windows Sidebar in Windows Vista) is a discontinued widget engine for Microsoft Gadgets. Desktop Gadgets have been replaced by Windows 10 Taskbar Widgets.  It was introduced with Windows Vista, in which it features a sidebar anchored to the side of the desktop. Its widgets can perform various tasks, such as displaying the time and date.  In Windows Vista, the widgets are restricted to a sidebar but in Windows 7, they can be freely moved anywhere on the desktop.

Windows Desktop Gadgets was discontinued in Windows 8. The Windows 8 Live Tiles can perform a similar function, but they are only visible when the Start menu is visible. They run in a more restrictive environment, making them less risky, but also less useful for some purposes, like system monitoring.

History 
Windows Sidebar originated in a Microsoft Research project called Sideshow (not to be confused with Windows SideShow.) It was developed in the summer of 2000, and was used internally at Microsoft.  It included a clock, traffic reports, and IM integration.

Windows Sidebar appeared in build 3683 of Windows Vista circa September 2002 and was originally intended to replace the notification area and Quick Launch toolbar in Windows, but these plans were scrapped after the development reset in mid-2004. Windows Sidebar was rebuilt and began to appear in Windows Vista builds in the second half of 2005. Some reviewers and Macintosh enthusiasts have pointed out the Sidebar's similarities in form and function to Konfabulator (later Yahoo! Widget Engine), which appeared several years previously, and the Dashboard widget engine first included with Apple Inc.'s Mac OS X v10.4, which had been released a few months earlier.

In Windows 7, Windows Sidebar was renamed Windows Desktop Gadgets, and the sidebar itself was not included in Windows 7.

Windows Desktop Gadgets was included in all beta releases of Windows 8 but did not make it to the final release. Instead, on 10 July 2012 (which is in the intervening time between the last beta of Windows 8 and its final release), Microsoft issued security advisory to disable Sidebar and Desktop Gadgets on Windows Vista and 7 because of a security vulnerability that could allow remote code execution.

Overview 
Windows Desktop Gadgets is a feature of Windows Vista and Windows 7 (excluding the Windows Server family of the operating system). It hosts mini-applications or "gadgets" which are a combination of scripts and HTML code. Their use cases include displaying  system time, downloading and displaying RSS feeds, or controlling other software such as Windows Media Player. In Windows Vista, gadgets can run "docked" in the sidebar. In Windows 7, they can "float" anywhere on the desktop. It is also possible to run multiple instances of a gadget simultaneously. Windows Vista and 7 sidebar also works on Windows XP.

Windows Vista ships with eleven gadgets: Calendar, Clock, Contacts, CPU Meter, Currency Conversion, Feed Headlines, Notes, Picture Puzzle, Slide Show, Stocks, and Weather. Several other gadgets available during the Vista beta such as App Launcher, Feed Viewer, Number Puzzle, Recycle Bin and Egg Timer never made it to the final release of Windows Vista. Windows 7 adds a Media Center gadget and removes the Contacts, Notes and Stocks gadgets. 

Originally, Microsoft provided a link to a web site called Windows Live Gallery where additional Sidebar gadgets that have been created by third-party developers could be downloaded. The site was officially retired on October 1, 2011.

See also 
 Microsoft Gadgets
 Windows SideShow for Device Gadgets
 Desk accessory

References

Further reading

External links 
 Gadget Corner — official Windows Sidebar and Microsoft Gadgets team blog
 Windows Sidebar Reference on MSDN

Widget engines
Sidebar
Discontinued Windows components

el:Windows Vista#Πλευρική εργαλειοθήκη